New York 1924 was an elite chess tournament held in the Alamac Hotel in New York City from March 16 to April 18, 1924.  It was organized by the Manhattan Chess Club.  The competitors included world champion José Raúl Capablanca and his predecessor Emanuel Lasker. Nine other top players from Europe and America were also invited. Emanuel Lasker met Alexander Alekhine, Efim Bogoljubow, Géza Maróczy, Richard Réti, Savielly Tartakower and Fred Yates in Hamburg. They steamed with the SS Cleveland on February 28, 1924, and joined Capablanca, Frank Marshall, Dawid Janowski and Edward Lasker in New York. The tournament was played as a double round robin, with each player meeting every other one twice. Emanuel Lasker won $1500 for first prize, plus generous payment for travel expenses. Capablanca won $1000, compensation for expenses, and an extra payment.

Results
The final results and standings:

{|class="wikitable" style="text-align: center;"
! # !! Player !! 1 !! 2 !! 3 !! 4 !! 5 !! 6 !! 7 !! 8 !! 9 !! 10 !! 11 !! Total
|-
| 1 || align=left| ||xx|| ½0 ||1½ ||½1 ||11 ||11 ||11 ||½1 ||½1 ||½1 ||11 || 16
|-
| 2 || align=left| || ½1 ||xx|| ½½ ||½½ ||01 ||½1 ||11 ||11 ||1½ ||½1 ||½1 || 14½
|-
| 3 || align=left| || 0½ ||½½ ||xx||½½ ||10 ||1½ ||½½ ||½½ ||11 ||½½ ||11 || 12
|-
| 4 || align=left| ||½0 ||½½ ||½½ ||xx|| ½1 ||0½ ||01 ||½0 ||½1 ||1½ ||11 || 11
|-
| 5 || align=left| || 00 ||10 ||01 ||½0 ||xx|| ½½ ||01 ||11 ||10 ||10 ||11 || 10½
|-
| 6 || align=left| ||00 ||½0 ||0½ ||1½ ||½½ ||xx|| 01 ||½½ ||11 ||½1 ||10 || 10
|-
| 7 || align=left| || 00 ||00 ||½½ ||10 ||10 ||10 ||xx|| 01 ||11 ||½1 ||01 || 9½
|-
| 8 || align=left| || ½0 ||00 ||½½ ||½1 ||00 ||½½ ||10 ||xx|| 10 ||½0 ||½1 || 8
|-
| 9 || align=left| || ½0 ||0½ ||00 ||½0 ||01 ||00 ||00 ||01 ||xx||11 ||½1 || 7
|-
|10 || align=left| || ½0 ||½0 ||½½ ||0½ ||01 ||½0 ||½0 ||½1 ||00 ||xx|| 0½ || 6½
|-
|11 || align=left| || 00 ||½0 ||00 ||00 ||00 ||01 ||10 ||½0 ||½0 ||1½ ||xx || 5
|}

References

Further reading
 New York 1924, by Alexander Alekhine, 2009 edition by Russell Enterprises, 

Chess competitions
Chess in the United States
1924 in chess
Sports competitions in New York City
1924 in sports in New York City
March 1924 sports events
April 1924 sports events